Nordre (Northern), formerly known as Haramsnytt (The Haram News), is a local Norwegian newspaper covering events in the northern part of the municipality of Ålesund in Møre og Romsdal county.

History
The newspaper was established as Haramsnytt in 1971, and changed its name to Nordre in 2013. The newspaper's office is located in the village of Brattvåg. The newspaper is published in Nynorsk. It is published twice a week, on Tuesdays and Fridays.

Editors
 Johan Kåre Tenfjord 1972 (January–October)
 Olav Giske 1972–1974
 Thorleif Marken, Karl E. Aakre, Torbjørg Giske, and Paul Farstad 1974–1978
 Ole M. Ellefsen 1978–1986
 Arnstein Sæthre 1986–1988
 Ole M. Ellefsen 1988 (June–December)
 May Britt Haukås 1989–1990
 Bjørg Riksfjord 1990–1991
 Ole M. Ellefsen 1991 (April–June)
 Bjørn Oskar Haukeberg 1991–1993
 Ole M. Ellefsen 1993–1998
 Hjørdis K. Skaar 1998–2000
 Ole M. Ellefsen 2000–2002
 Hjørdis K. Skaar 2002–2010
 Einar Schibevaag 2010–2011
 Hjørdis K. Skaar 2011
 Ole Reinlund 2011–2013
 Robin Røkke Johansen 2013–

Circulation
According to the Norwegian Audit Bureau of Circulations and National Association of Local Newspapers, Nordre has had the following annual circulation:

References

External links
Nordre website—

1971 establishments in Norway
Ålesund
Mass media in Møre og Romsdal
Nynorsk
Newspapers established in 1971
Newspapers published in Norway
Norwegian-language newspapers